This list includes the biological mothers of Safavid Shahs. There were eleven shahs (kings) of the Safavid Empire in ten generations. Throughout 235-years history the shahs were all members of the same house, the house of Safavid.

See also
 Safavid dynasty family tree

References

Sources
 
 

Lists of Iranian women

Safavid
Women of Safavid Iran
Safavid imperial harem